Gary Lockwood (born John Gary Yurosek; February 21, 1937) is an American actor. Lockwood is best known for his roles as astronaut Frank Poole in the film 2001: A Space Odyssey (1968), and as Lieutenant Commander Gary Mitchell in the Star Trek second pilot episode "Where No Man Has Gone Before" (1966). He starred in the only American film by French New Wave director Jacques Demy, Model Shop. He played numerous guest television roles from the early 1960s into the mid 1990s, and played the title role in The Lieutenant (1963–1964).

Early life
Lockwood was born in Van Nuys, Los Angeles, California as John Gary Yurosek of partial Polish descent. His uncle, Mike Yurosek, is credited with creating the baby-cut carrots. Lockwood attended the University of California at Los Angeles (UCLA) on a football scholarship to play quarterback. He was a one-year letterman for legendary Coach Red Sanders in 1956 and is listed as Gary Yurosek in official UCLA Athletics records.

Career

Lockwood was a film stuntman, and a stand-in for Anthony Perkins prior to his acting début in 1959 in an uncredited bit role in Warlock.

Lockwood's two series came early in his career, and each lasted only a single season. ABC's Hawaii-set Follow the Sun (1961–62) cast him in support of Brett Halsey and Barry Coe, who played adventurous magazine writers based in Honolulu. Lockwood was Eric Jason, who did the legwork for their articles. He appeared in a supporting role in the film Splendor in the Grass (1961) and in ABC's TV series Bus Stop (1961). The 26-week series, which starred Marilyn Maxwell as the owner of a diner in fictitious Sunrise, Colorado, aired a half-hour after Follow the Sun. He would star again with Tuesday Weld in his film debut, Wild in the Country (1961), with Elvis Presley. Thereafter, Lockwood starred with Jeff Bridges in the acclaimed "My Daddy Can Beat Your Daddy" episode of The Lloyd Bridges Show. In 1959, he had an uncredited role as a police officer in the Perry Mason episode "The Case of the Romantic Rogue". In 1962, Lockwood again appeared on Perry Mason in the lead role in "The Case of the Playboy Pugilist". In 1963, Lockwood co-starred with Elvis Presley in the musical-comedy film It Happened at the World's Fair.

In 1963–64, Lockwood starred as a young U.S. Marine second lieutenant named William T. ("Bill") Rice in the NBC series The Lieutenant. This drama, about the peacetime Marines, was produced by the creators of Star Trek (Gene Roddenberry) and The Man from U.N.C.L.E. (Norman Felton). The series co-starred Robert Vaughn as Lieutenant Rice's immediate superior, Captain Raymond Rambridge. Despite moderately good reviews, The Lieutenant Saturday night time slot, opposite CBS' popular Jackie Gleason's American Scene Magazine, hastened its cancellation after 29 episodes.

In 1964, Lockwood guest-starred as Major Gus Denver in the first season of 12 O'Clock High, in episode 9, "Appointment at Liege", and again in 1965 in episode 29, "V For Vendetta". He also guest-starred as Lt. Josh McGraw in season 2, episode 4, "The Idolator" of 12 O'Clock High. Shortly afterwards, Lockwood starred in another NBC television series The Kraft Mystery Theater (also known as Crisis) in an episode titled "Connery's Hands". He was cast opposite Sally Kellerman, with whom he would soon appear again as Helmsman Gary Mitchell in the second Star Trek pilot "Where No Man Has Gone Before" (1965) in which their characters developed malign super powers.

In 1966, Lockwood guest starred as Clint Bethard in the episode "Reunion" of ABC's The Legend of Jesse James, starring Christopher Jones in the title role of Jesse James. That same year, Lockwood appeared as Danny Hamil on the episode "Day of Thunder" of the NBC drama The Long, Hot Summer, based loosely on the works of William Faulkner. He appeared twice in 1966 as Jim Stark in the two-part episode "The Raid" of CBS' Gunsmoke with James Arness. He is perhaps best known for his co-starring role in Stanley Kubrick's iconic 2001: A Space Odyssey (1968) as Dr. Frank Poole. Lockwood was the lead in Model Shop (1969), the American debut by French writer-director Jacques Demy.

Lockwood co-starred with Stefanie Powers (then his wife) in an episode of ABC's Love, American Style as a newlywed who gets his mouth stuck around a doorknob. In 1983, he guest starred in the series Hart to Hart ("Emily by Hart") with Robert Wagner and Powers, by then his ex-wife. Between 1959 and 2004, Lockwood gained roles in some forty theatrical features and made-for-TV movies and eighty TV guest appearances, including the CBS 1975 family drama Three for the Road and Barnaby Jones starring Buddy Ebsen, in which he appeared many times as a villain.

Personal life
Lockwood has been married two times. His first marriage was in 1966 to actress Stefanie Powers. The couple divorced in 1972. In 1982, Lockwood married actress and businesswoman Denise DuBarry. with whom he has a daughter Samantha Du Barry-Lockwood (28.04.1982) who is an International Yoga teacher, actress, model, and business woman.

TV and filmography

 Onionhead (1958) as Sergeant Seated at Bar (uncredited)
 Bronco Lane (1959,TV Series) as Johnny Evans (credited as Gary Yurosek)
 Warlock (1959) as Gang Member (uncredited)
 Perry Mason (1959-1962, TV Series) as Davey Carroll / Young Policeman
 Tall Story (1960) as Russian Basketball Player (uncredited)
 Wild in the Country (1961) as Cliff Macy
 Splendor in the Grass (1961) as Allen 'Toots' Tuttle
 Follow the Sun (1961-1962) as Eric Jason
 The Magic Sword (1962) as Sir George
 It Happened at the World's Fair (1963) as Danny Burke
 The Lieutenant (1963-1964, TV Series) as Lieutenant Rice
 Combat! (1964, TV Series) as Sgt. Meider
 Kitten with a Whip (1964) as Minor Role (uncredited)
 12 O'Clock High (1964-1965, TV Series) as Maj. Gus Denver / Lt. Josh McGraw
 Star Trek: The Original Series (1966, TV Series) as Lt. Cmdr. Gary Mitchell
 Firecreek (1968) as Earl
 2001: A Space Odyssey (1968) as Dr. Frank Poole
 They Came to Rob Las Vegas (1968) as Tony Ferris
 Model Shop (1969) as George Matthews
 R. P. M. (1970) as Rossiter
 Earth II (TV pilot) (1971, TV Movie) as David Seville
 Stand Up and Be Counted (1972) as Eliot Travis
 Barnaby Jones (1973–79) 6 episodes throughout series
 Night Gallery (1973, TV Series) as Jim Figg
 Mission Impossible (1973, TV Series) as Nicholas Varsi
 Banacek (1973, TV Series) as Owen Russell
 The Six Million Dollar Man "Eyewitness to Murder" (1974-1975, TV Series) as Hopper / John Hopper
  Cannon (1975) "Coffin Corner" as Richard Halsey 
 Project Kill (1976) as Frank Lassiter
 The Quest (1976, TV Series, a short-lived NBC western) as Walter Lucas
 Walt Disney's Wonderful World of Color in 2-part episode, "Kit Carson and the Mountain Men" (1977, TV Series) as Bret Haskell
 Bad Georgia Road (1977) as Leroy Hastings
 The Bionic Woman (1977) as Lyle Cannon
 Starsky & Hutch (1978, TV Series) as Jimmy Spenser
 The Ghost of Flight 401 (1978, TV Movie) as Jordan Evanhower
 The Incredible Journey of Doctor Meg Laurel (1979, TV Movie) as Harley Moon
 Top of the Hill (1980, TV Movie) as Dave Cully
 Vega$ (1980, TV Series) as District Attorney Edward St. John
 Hart to Hart (1983, TV Series) as Alex Carmen
 Emergency Room (1983, TV Movie) as Dr. David Becker
 Survival Zone (1983) as Ben Faber
 Simon and Simon (1984-1986) as Dr. Maynard Ellis / Exec. Prod. Ron Redding / Daniel C. Thacker / Eddie Blair / Air Force Col. Christopher J. Ahern
 Murder, She Wrote (1985-1994) as Sam Mercer / Sheriff Deloy Hays / Tom Carpenter / Harris Talmadge
 The Wild Pair (1987) as Captain Kramer
 MacGyver (1988, TV Series) as Grant
 Terror in Paradise (1990) as Major Douglas
 Night of the Scarecrow (1995) as Mayor William Goodman
 A Bedfull of Foreigners (1998) as Dieter Dieterman

References

External links

Official website

1937 births
Living people
American male film actors
American male television actors
People from Van Nuys, Los Angeles
UCLA Bruins football players
20th-century American male actors
21st-century American male actors
American people of Polish descent